Magdalena Sroczyńska (born 28 May 1982) is a Polish former competitive pair skater who competed with Sławomir Borowiecki. The pair skated together in the mid-1990s and placed 14th at the 1996 Europeans.

Competitive highlights
1996 : European Championships - 14th,
1996 : World Junior Championships - 4th,
1995 : Nebelhorn Trophy - 10th.

References

Polish female pair skaters
Living people
1982 births
Sportspeople from Łódź